Zamin-e Hasan (also Romanized as Zamīn-e Ḩasan; also known as Zemīn-e Ḩasan) is a village in Gafr and Parmon Rural District, Gafr and Parmon District, Bashagard County, Hormozgan Province, Iran. At the 2006 census, its population was 195, in 53 families.

References 

Populated places in Bashagard County